The 1993 Swedish Golf Tour, known as the Lancôme Tour for sponsorship reasons, was the eighth season of the Swedish Golf Tour, a series of professional golf tournaments for women held in Sweden.

1993 was the third year with Lancôme as the main sponsor. The tour attracted international players as the LET only featured 12 events this season. The number of events increased by two and the oldest tournament, the Höganäs Ladies Open, celebrated its 10th and penultimate installment, won by Annika Sörenstam.

A teenage Maria Hjorth won two tournaments while Carin Hjalmarsson won three, and captured her second Order of Merit.

Schedule
The season consisted of 9 tournaments played between May and September, where one was a 1993 Ladies European Tour event.

Order of Merit

Source:

See also
1993 Swedish Golf Tour (men's tour)

References

External links
Official homepage of the Swedish Golf Tour

Swedish Golf Tour (women)
Swedish Golf Tour (women)